Paul P. Coventry (5 December 1952) is an English former professional rugby league footballer who played in the 1970s and 1980s.

Background
Paul Coventry was born in Pontefract, West Riding of Yorkshire, England.

Playing career

Challenge Cup Final appearances
Paul Coventry played , i.e. number 2, in the Featherstone Rovers' 33–14 victory over Bradford Northern in the 1973 Challenge Cup Final during the 1972–73 season at Wembley Stadium, London on Saturday 12 May 1973, in front of a crowd of 72,395, a broken arm meant he didn't play in the 9–24 defeat by Warrington in the 1974 Challenge Cup Final.

County Cup Final appearances
Paul Coventry played as an  interchange/substitute, i.e. number 14,  (replacing  Chris Harding) in the Featherstone Rovers' 7–23 defeat by Leeds in the 1970 Yorkshire County Cup Final during the 1970–71 season, at Odsal Stadium, Bradford on Saturday 21 November 1970, and played right-, i.e. number 3, in the 12–16 defeat by Leeds in the 1976 Yorkshire County Cup Final during the 1976–77 season, at Headingley Rugby Stadium, Leeds on Saturday 16 October 1976.

Club career
Paul Coventry made his début for the Featherstone Rovers on Saturday 19 September 1970, during his time at Wakefield Trinity he scored five 3-point tries, and four 4-point tries.

Testimonial match
Paul Coventry's benefit season/testimonial match at Featherstone Rovers took place during the 1981–82 season.

Honoured at Featherstone Rovers
Paul Coventry is a Featherstone Rovers Hall of Fame Inductee.

Genealogical information
Paul Coventry is the younger brother of the rugby league footballer who played in the 1970s for Castleford; John P. Coventry (birth registered during third ¼  in Pontefract district), and is the uncle of John Coventry's son, the rugby league  who played in the 1990s and 2000s, for the Castleford Tigers, the Huddersfield Giants and the Featherstone Rovers (Heritage No. 776) (three spells), and the Batley Bulldogs; James Coventry.

References

External links
Paul Coventry and Jamie Coventry

1952 births
Living people
English rugby league players
Featherstone Rovers players
Rugby league centres
Rugby league five-eighths
Rugby league players from Pontefract
Rugby league wingers
Wakefield Trinity players